The 2018 Western Kentucky Hilltoppers football team (WKU) represented Western Kentucky University in the 2018 NCAA Division I FBS football season. The Hilltoppers played their home games at the Houchens Industries–L. T. Smith Stadium in Bowling Green, Kentucky as members of the East Division of Conference USA (C–USA). They were led by second-year head coach Mike Sanford Jr. They finished the season 3–9, 2–6 in C-USA play to finish in a tie for sixth place in the East Division.

On November 25, head coach Mike Sanford Jr. was fired after only two seasons. He finished at WKU with a record of 9–16.

Previous season
The Hilltoppers finished the 2017 season 6–7, 4–4 in C-USA play to finish in a tie for third place in the East Division. They received an invite to the Cure Bowl where they lost to Georgia State.

Preseason

Award watch lists
Listed in the order that they were released

Preseason media poll
Conference USA released their preseason media poll on July 17, 2018, with the Hilltoppers predicted to finish in fourth place in the East Division.

Schedule

Schedule Source:

Game summaries

at Wisconsin

Maine

at Louisville

at Ball State

Marshall

at Charlotte

Old Dominion

FIU

at Middle Tennessee

at Florida Atlantic

UTEP

at Louisiana Tech

References

Western Kentucky
Western Kentucky Hilltoppers football seasons
Western Kentucky Hilltoppers football